The Women's 5 km competition of the 2020 European Aquatics Championships was held on 12 May 2021.

Results
The race was held at 11:00.

References

Women's 5 km